Her Heritage is a 1919 British silent crime film directed by Bannister Merwin and starring Jack Buchanan, Phyllis Monkman and Edward O'Neill.

Cast
 Jack Buchanan as Bob Hales  
 Phyllis Monkman as Lady Mary Strode  
 E. Holman Clark as Gerald Pridling  
 Edward O'Neill as Lord Heston 
 Winifred Dennis as Mrs. Wilter

References

Bibliography
 Burton, Alan & Chinbnall, Steve. Historical Dictionary of British Cinema. Scarecrow Press, 2013.

External links

1919 films
1919 crime films
British silent feature films
British crime films
Films directed by Bannister Merwin
Films set in England
British black-and-white films
1910s English-language films
1910s British films